Zuzana Malíková (born 2 August 1983, in Nové Zámky) is a female race walker from Slovakia.

Achievements

References

1983 births
Living people
Slovak female racewalkers
Athletes (track and field) at the 2004 Summer Olympics
Athletes (track and field) at the 2008 Summer Olympics
Olympic athletes of Slovakia
People from Nové Zámky
Sportspeople from the Nitra Region
Competitors at the 2005 Summer Universiade
Competitors at the 2007 Summer Universiade